Kåre Simensen (born 30 August 1955) is a Norwegian politician for the Labour Party.

He was born in Alta and finished secondary school here in 1978. Between lower secondary school and upper secondary school he worked in the shale industry. He then worked with IT. He took education as an IT engineer at Gjøvik Engineer's College from 1979 to 1982 and has a degree in economics from Finnmark University College in 1990.

He was a member of Alta municipal council from 1995 to 2007, serving the last term as deputy mayor. From 2007 to 2009 he was a member of the executive in Finnmark county council, and was also a board member of the Northern Norway Regional Health Authority. He was elected to the Parliament of Norway in 2009 as the party's second candidate from Finnmark.

References

1955 births
Living people
People from Alta, Norway
Members of the Storting
Finnmark politicians
Labour Party (Norway) politicians
21st-century Norwegian politicians